Charlotte is a 1981 West German-Dutch film directed by Frans Weisz. It is a biography about German-Jewish painter Charlotte Salomon, who died in the Holocaust.

Cast
Birgit Doll	... 	Charlotte Salomon
Elisabeth Trissenaar	... 	Paulinka
Brigitte Horney	... 	Grandma
Max Croiset... 	Albert
Peter Capell	... 	Grandfather
Derek Jacobi	... 	Daberlohn
Buddy Elias	... 	Herr Schwartz
Peter Faber	... 	Frits Blech
Eric Vaessen	... 	Herr Deutscher
Maria Machado	... 	Frau Schwartz
Shireen Strooker	... 	Mukki
Lous Hensen	... 	Frau Deutscher
Yoka Berretty	... 	Frau Morgan
Patricia Hodge	... 	Teacher
Irene Jarosch	... 	Magda

External links 
 

1981 films
1980s German-language films
1980s Dutch-language films
Films set in France
Films set in Germany
Films set in the 1930s
Films set in the 1940s
Holocaust films
Biographical films about painters
Cultural depictions of Charlotte Salomon
1981 multilingual films
German multilingual films
Dutch multilingual films